The Santa Barbara Dodgers was the main nickname of minor league baseball teams in the Class A California League based in the Pacific Ocean coastal resort city of Santa Barbara, California.

History
The Santa Barbara Dodgers were an affiliate of the Brooklyn Dodgers (in Brooklyn, New York) of the National League and later their successors, the Los Angeles Dodgers (after 1955) from 1941 to 1953 and 1964 to1967. They won the league championships in 1941, 1948 and 1951. The Dodgers entered the California League in 1964 to replace the previous Santa Barbara Rancheros. The Dodgers' home stadium was Laguna Ball Park.

The Santa Barbara Dodgers were plagued by low crowd attendances, averaging only 225 spectators per game. At the end of the 1967 season, the Santa Barbara Dodgers franchise was transferred east to Bakersfield, California. The Laguna Park stadium was demolished in 1970, and replaced by a parking lot, and no professional minor league baseball team has been based in Santa Barbara since.

Notable alumni

Baseball Hall of Fame alumni
 Sparky Anderson (1953) inducted 2000
 Don Sutton (1965) inducted 1998 
 Dick Williams (1947) inducted 2008

Notable alumni

 Jack Billingham (1964) MLB All-Star
 Paul Blair (1962) 2 x MLB All-Star; 8 x Gold Glove
 Rocky Bridges (1947-1948) MLB All-Star
 Willie Crawford (1964)
 Bruce Edwards (1941) 2 x MLB All-Star
 Alan Foster (1965)
 Jim Gentile (1952) 6 x MLB All-Star
 Hal Gregg (1941) MLB All-Star
 Von Joshua (1967)
 Irv Noren (1946) MLB All-Star
 Wes Parker (1963)
Larry Sherry (1953) 1959 World Series Most Valuable Player

References

External links
Professional Baseball in Santa Barbara
Minor league ball in Santa Barbara
Baseball Reference.com: Baseball in Santa Barbara

Defunct baseball teams in California
 01
Defunct minor league baseball teams
Dodgers
Dodgers
Defunct California League teams
Los Angeles Dodgers minor league affiliates
Brooklyn Dodgers minor league affiliates
New York Mets minor league affiliates
20th century in California
History of Santa Barbara, California
Baseball teams disestablished in 1967
Baseball teams established in 1941